Blue Creek, also Blue Creek Colony, is a Mennonite settlement that is also an administrative village in Orange Walk District in Belize. It borders Blue Creek river, which forms the border to Mexico. Its inhabitants are Plautdietsch-speaking Russian Mennonites.

In 1958 Blue Creek was founded by Old Colony Mennonites from Mexico. Disputes about the use of mechanical tools, especially chain saws, soon led conflicts, which resulted in the founding of an Evangelical Mennonite Mission Conference congregation in 1966 there, while others left to Bolivia, Mexico and Canada. In the end also the leaders of the Old Colony church left, forcing members to decide whether they would leave with them or join other groups. In 1978 families of the Kleine Gemeinde congregation from Spanish Lookout population moved to Blue Creek, to form a congregation there. Today about half of population is in the modern Evangelical Mennonite Mission Church, which is part of the Evangelical Mennonite Mission Conference, while the other half is in the more conservative Kleine Gemeinde.

Since about 1980 the population of Blue Creek is around 100 families. According to the 2010 census, Blue Creek had a population of 407 people in 111 households.

See also 
 Mennonites in Belize

External links 

Anabaptistwiki: Kleine Gemeinde zu Blue Creek

References 

Kleine Gemeinde
Mennonitism in Belize
Mexican Belizean
Old Colony Mennonites
Populated places in Orange Walk District
Russian Mennonite diaspora in Belize